Andrija Mandić (Serbian Cyrillic: Андрија Мандић; born 19 January 1965) is a Montenegrin politician serving as a member of the Parliament of Montenegro since 2020 and the president of the right-wing New Serb Democracy (NSD / NOVA). He was the head of the Democratic Front parliamentary club in the parliament until 2020.

Private life 
Andrija Mandic was born in 1965 in Šavnik, Socialist Republic of Montenegro, Socialist Federal Republic of Yugoslavia. He graduated at the Metallurgic-Technical Faculty at the Veljko Vlahović University in Podgorica.

Political life 

Andrija Mandić started his political career by joining the People's Party, which claimed restoration of the old political party, the very first Montenegrin one, in the old Montenegrin monarchy.

In 1997, he became one of the founders of the Serb People's Party of Montenegro, when numerous members of the People's Party of Montenegro defected from the political party, disagreeing with the party's Novak Kilibarda leadership's decision to form a coalition with the ruling Milo Đukanović's Democratic Party of Socialists of Montenegro. SNS CG considered that NS CG abandoned the national original aims of the party.

Mandić fought in the Yugoslav Army's 5th Motorized Brigade during the Kosovo War.

From 2000 to 2001, Mandić was the deputy minister of economy of FR Yugoslavia.

During the 2006 Montenegrin independence referendum, Mandić called for minorities to be banned from voting. After the referendum ended in favor of independence, at first he refused to accept the referendum and declared that Albanians should never have been allowed to vote.

In 2008, Andrija Mandic became the first president of Serb List transformed into party - New Serb Democracy. Mandić sought to transform the Serb List coalition into a more civic-oriented party, in order to boost the party's coalition potential, and even the dropping of the "Serb" prefix from the newly formed party's name was considered. This idea was met with strong resistance during the merger talks.

In 2009 parliamentary election NOVA ran independently and won 9,2% of the votes, and 8 seats. In the next parliamentary election held in 2012, the party ran within the Democratic Front coalition which was second ranked electoral list with 22,8% of the votes and 20 seats, out of which NOVA won 8.

Mandić led the Democratic Front coalition during the parliamentary election held in 2016, which was again second ranked electoral list with 20,32% of the votes and 18 seats, out of which NOVA again won 8.

Democratic Front MPs physically halted the process of adopting of the controversial "Law on Freedom of Religion or Belief and the Legal Status of Religious Communities" in the Montenegrin Parliament. Mandić and all other MPs were subsequently arrested, without their MP immunity being revoked.

Andrija Mandić decided to be the last person on the electoral list For the Future of Montenegro in order to more easily bridge the gap between the various ethnic Serb and pro-Serb political parties in Montenegro. In the 2020 parliamentary election the list went on to win 32.55% of the votes and 27 seats, out of which 21 went to the Democratic Front alliance and 9 of those went to NOVA.

Mandić has been declared as the presidential candidate of the Democratic Front coalition for the 2023 Montenegrin presidential election.

Involvement in alleged coup d'état

On 15 February 2017, Andrija Mandić was stripped of his parliamentary immunity in connection with an ongoing criminal prosecution against him. On 8 June 2017, the High Court in Podgorica confirmed the indictment of Andrija Mandić, along with thirteen other persons, including two Russian nationals and Milan Knežević, on charges that included "preparing a conspiracy against the constitutional order and the security of Montenegro" and an "attempted terrorist act." In February 2021, the Montenegrin appellate court overturned the first-instance verdict against Mandić and the other defendants, and ordered a retrial.

Honours

Orders

References

1965 births
Living people
People from Šavnik
Serbs of Montenegro
Serb People's Party (Montenegro) politicians
New Serb Democracy politicians
Members of the Parliament of Montenegro
Union of Reform Forces of Yugoslavia politicians
People's Party (Montenegro, 1990) politicians
Serbian nationalists
Candidates for President of Montenegro